P. Dhanapal (born 16 May 1951) is an Indian politician and incumbent Member of the Legislative Assembly of Tamil Nadu. He is a former Speaker of Tamil Nadu Legislative Assembly.

P. Dhanapal  was born on 16 May 1951 in Karupur. He obtained a master's degree and is married with two children.

Dhanapal was elected to the Tamil Nadu Legislative Assembly as an All India Anna Dravida Munnetra Kazhagam candidate from Sankagiri constituency in the 1977, 1980 and 1984 and 2001 elections. In the 2011 and 2016 Tamil Nadu assembly elections he won from Rasipuram and Avanashi constituencies, respectively.

References 

All India Anna Dravida Munnetra Kazhagam politicians
Living people
Speakers of the Tamil Nadu Legislative Assembly
Deputy Speakers of the Tamil Nadu Legislative Assembly
Tamil Nadu MLAs 2011–2016
Tamil Nadu MLAs 2016–2021
1951 births
People from Salem district
Tamil Nadu MLAs 1985–1989
Tamil Nadu MLAs 2001–2006
Tamil Nadu MLAs 2021–2026
Tamil Nadu politicians